Kurt Arne Pettersén (21 June 1916 – 15 November 1957) was a bantamweight Greco-Roman wrestler from Sweden who won a gold medal at the 1948 Summer Olympics. He won silver medals at the European championships in 1938 and 1939 (Greco-Roman) and 1949 (freestyle).

Kurt was born in a family of 11 siblings with Norwegian roots. Between 1936 and 1951 he won 22 Swedish titles in wrestling. He died of cancer aged 41.

References

1916 births
1957 deaths
People from Borås
Olympic wrestlers of Sweden
Wrestlers at the 1948 Summer Olympics
Swedish male sport wrestlers
Olympic gold medalists for Sweden
Olympic medalists in wrestling
Medalists at the 1948 Summer Olympics
Sportspeople from Västra Götaland County
20th-century Swedish people